Now Winter 2006 is a compilation CD released by Festival Mushroom Records, Warner Bros. & EMI in 2006. It is the 13th CD in the Australian Now! series. The album reached number 12 on the 2006 ARIA Year End Compilation Album chart
and was certified platinum.

Track listing
Youth Group – "Forever Young" (4:31)
The Veronicas – "When It All Falls Apart" (3:15)
James Blunt – "Wisemen" (3:43)
Robbie Williams – "Sin Sin Sin" (4:03)
Mousse T. vs. The Dandy Warhols – "Horny as a Dandy" (3:15)
Bob Sinclar featuring Steve Edwards – "World, Hold On (Children of the Sky)" (3:19)
Fort Minor featuring Holly Brook and Jonah Matranga – "Where'd You Go" (3:52)
Savage featuring Aaradhna – "They Don't Know" (3:38)
Eskimo Joe – "Black Fingernails, Red Wine" (4:08)
Sean Paul – "Temperature" (3:36)
Coldplay – "The Hardest Part" (4:23)
Rob Thomas – "...Something to Be" (4:28)
Dirty South vs. Evermore – "It's Too Late (Ride On)" (3:01)
Hi_Tack – "Say Say Say (Waiting 4 U)" (2:52)
The Source featuring Candi Staton – "You Got the Love" (New Voyager Remix) (3:11)
The Living End – "Wake Up" (4:31)
Kisschasy – "The Shake" (3:58)
The Darkness – "Is It Just Me?" (3:06)
Kate Alexa – "All I Hear" (3:25)
Gorillaz – "El Mañana" (3:50)
Paul Mac featuring Aaradhna – "Love Declaration" (3:52)

References

External links
 NOW Winter 2006 @ Australian Charts

2006 compilation albums
EMI Records compilation albums
Warner Records compilation albums
Now That's What I Call Music! albums (Australian series)